Nickel(II) oxide is the chemical compound with the formula . It is the principal oxide of nickel. It is classified as a basic metal oxide. Several million kilograms are produced annually of varying quality, mainly as an intermediate in the production of nickel alloys.

Production
 can be prepared by multiple methods. Upon heating above 400 °C, nickel powder reacts with oxygen to give . The simplest and most successful method of preparation is through pyrolysis of nickel(II) compounds such as the hydroxide, nitrate, and carbonate, which yield a light green powder. Synthesis from the elements by heating the metal in oxygen can yield grey to black powders which indicates nonstoichiometry.

Structure
 adopts the  structure, with octahedral Ni2+ and O2− sites. The conceptually simple structure is commonly known as the rock salt structure. Like many other binary metal oxides,  is often non-stoichiometric, meaning that the Ni:O ratio deviates from 1:1. In nickel oxide, this non-stoichiometry is accompanied by a color change, with the stoichiometrically correct NiO being green and the non-stoichiometric  being black.

Applications and reactions
 has a variety of specialized applications and generally, applications distinguish between "chemical grade", which is relatively pure material for specialty applications, and "metallurgical grade", which is mainly used for the production of alloys. It is used in the ceramic industry to make frits, ferrites, and porcelain glazes. The sintered oxide is used to produce nickel steel alloys. Charles Édouard Guillaume won the 1920 Nobel Prize in Physics for his work on nickel steel alloys which he called invar and elinvar.

 is a commonly used hole transport material in thin film solar cells. It was also a component in the nickel-iron battery, also known as the Edison Battery, and is a component in fuel cells. It is the precursor to many nickel salts, for use as specialty chemicals and catalysts. More recently,  was used to make the NiCd rechargeable batteries found in many electronic devices until the development of the environmentally superior NiMH battery.  an anodic electrochromic material, have been widely studied as counter electrodes with tungsten oxide, cathodic electrochromic material, in complementary electrochromic devices.

About 4000 tons of chemical grade  are produced annually. Black  is the precursor to nickel salts, which arise by treatment with mineral acids.  is a versatile hydrogenation catalyst.

Heating nickel oxide with either hydrogen, carbon, or carbon monoxide reduces it to metallic nickel. It combines with the oxides of sodium and potassium at high temperatures (>700 °C) to form the corresponding nickelate.

Electronic structure
NiO is useful for illustrating the failure of density functional theory (using functionals based on the local-density approximation) and Hartree–Fock theory to account for the strong correlation. The term strong correlation refers to behavior of electrons in solids that is not well described (often not even in a qualitatively correct manner) by simple one-electron theories such as the local-density approximation (LDA) or Hartree–Fock theory. For instance, the seemingly simple material NiO has a partially filled 3d-band (the Ni atom has 8 of 10 possible 3d-electrons) and therefore would be expected to be a good conductor. However, strong Coulomb repulsion (a correlation effect) between d-electrons makes NiO instead a wide band gap Mott insulator. Thus, NiO has an electronic structure that is neither simply free-electron-like nor completely ionic, but a mixture of both.

Health risks
Long-term inhalation of NiO is damaging to the lungs, causing lesions and in some cases cancer.

The calculated half-life of dissolution of NiO in the blood is more than 90 days. NiO has a long retention half-time in the lungs; after administration to rodents, it persisted in the lungs for more than 3 months. Nickel oxide is classified as a human carcinogen based on increased respiratory cancer risks observed in epidemiological studies of sulfidic ore refinery workers.

In a 2-year National Toxicology Program green NiO inhalation study, some evidence of carcinogenicity in F344/N rats but equivocal evidence in female B6C3F1 mice was observed; there was no evidence of carcinogenicity in male B6C3F1 mice. Chronic inflammation without fibrosis was observed in the 2-year studies.

References

External links
Bunsenite at mindat.org
Bunsenite mineral data

Transition metal oxides
Nickel compounds
Non-stoichiometric compounds
IARC Group 1 carcinogens
Hydrogenation catalysts
Rock salt crystal structure